Subhadeep Ghosh is the former Indian First Class cricketer who played for Assam and Railways. He is the current fielding coach of the IPL team Delhi Capitals.

During his playing days, Subhadeep Ghosh played 17 First Class matches and 17 List A matches for Assam and Railways. He was a right-handed batsman who was fondly known as Joy by his teammates.

References

External links
 
 IPL team Delhi Capitals web page on official IPL T20 website - IPLT20.com
 The Official Delhi Capitals Site

1968 births
Living people
Cricketers from Assam